Institute of Social Welfare and Research is one of the oldest institutes of the University of Dhaka. It is the apex institution for the social work education in Bangladesh. It offers Graduation, Post-Graduation, M.Phil and PhD degrees to students in social welfare/social work.

The institute is situated in New Market area in the capital, adjacent to the gate-3 of Border Guard Bangladesh headquarters. It is situated in the same premises of two female dormitories of the University of Dhaka, Begum Fajilatunnessa Mujib Hall and Bangladesh- Kuwait Maitree Hall and detached from the main campus of the University of Dhaka.

History

The College of Social Welfare and Research Centre was established in 1958 as a constituent college of the University of Dhaka.

Later in 1973, the college was made an institute of the University of Dhaka and renamed as the Institute of Social Welfare and Research. A separate premises was allocated to the institute, where the Academic Building with one Men's and one Girls' hostel for the institutes' students were constructed by the end of 1974, where after the Academic activity of the Institute commenced in the said premises.

The academic building was attached with a large open field within the premises, which became the only after-noon recreational place for inhabitant of the adjacent residential locality New Paltan. In the years 1997 and 2008 two four storied girls' students halls of the Dhaka University namely Bangladesh Kuwait Maitree Hall and Begum Fajilatunnesa Mujib Hall respectively, were constructed in that field covering the whole area. This had made the entire premises a congested area, destroying the earlier beauty of the premises.

Programs

BSS Honors Program
Masters Program
M. Phil Program
 Ph.D. Program

Facilities

 A K Ahamadulla Library
 Seminar Room
 Cyber Centre
Social Welfare Canteen

Publications

Journal of Social Development

Extra curricular activities

 Social Welfare Debating Club
 Social Welfare English Club
 YES, TIB-Social Welfare
 Social Welfare Cricket Team has become champion of the Intra-department cricket match of Dhaka University in 2017. Some prominent players are Abdullah al Masud, Mohammadullah Nirob, Robiul Islam, Didar,Saif Talukder, Rezaul and others.

Social Welfare Alumni Association (SWAA)

Social Welfare Alumni Association is a platform of the former students of the institute. Professor M A Momen is the president and Jahangir Murshed is the General Secretary of the association.

Notable alumni

 Colonel Abu Taher, Biruttam, Sector Commander of the Liberation War of Bangladesh. 
 Tahrunessa Abdullah, first Bangladeshi who was awarded Ramon Magsaysay award for community leadership in 1978 
 Md. Shahidul Haque, Senior Secretary, Ministry of Foreign Affairs 
A.K.M. Shahidul Haque, Served as the 27th Inspector General of Bangladesh Police.
Dr. Mohammad Javed Patwary, Retired-IGP and Currently working as Ambassador of Bangladesh to Saudi Arabia.

References

http://www.eduicon.com/Institute/?Institute_Basic_ID=4198

External links
 

University of Dhaka
Think tanks based in Bangladesh
Research institutes in Bangladesh
Social science institutes